70588 Frank Sinatra Drive is a mid-century modern house in Rancho Mirage, California, that was the residence of the singer and actor Frank Sinatra from 1957 to 1995.

See also
 Twin Palms, Sinatra's Palm Springs residence from 1947 to 1954

References

Houses completed in 1957
Frank Sinatra
Modernist architecture in California
Buildings and structures in Palm Springs, California
Tourist attractions in Palm Springs, California